Yoramu Bamunoba (b. July 1931) was the inaugural Bishop of West Ankole, serving from 1977 to 2007.

Bamunoba was born at Kacuncu Village, Keihangara, Ibanda District. He was educated at Nkondo Primary School, Mbarara High School, Busoga College and Kyambogo University. He was ordained in 1966. He taught at Bishop Stuart College  and was Chaplainat Makerere University.

References

Ugandan Anglicans
1931 births
Anglican bishops of West Ankole
20th-century Anglican bishops in Uganda
People from Ibanda District
Uganda Christian University alumni
People educated at Mbarara High School
People educated at Busoga College
Ugandan educators
Kyambogo University alumni
Living people